Alfonso Buenhombre (Latin: Alphonsus Bonihominis; died ) was a Dominican missionary and polemicist.

Life 
Alfonso was born, probably in Galicia, or perhaps at Toledo, at the close of the 13th century. He travelled to Egypt in 1336, and to Morocco. He became Bishop of Morocco in 1344. He died, probably at Marrakesh, about 1353.

Works 
The celebrated anti-Jewish writing called Epistola Samuelis Maroccani ('Epistle of Samuel the Moroccan'), which gives in twenty-seven chapters a refutation of Jewish objections to the Christian faith, is said to have been translated from the Arabic or the Hebrew into the Latin by Alfonsus Bonihominis in 1329, under the title, Tractatulus multum utilis ad convincendum Judaeos de errore suo, quem habent de Messia adhuc venturo, et de observantia legis Mosaiae ('A very useful treatise to convince the Jews of their error, which they have about the Messiah yet to come, and about the observance of the Mosaic law').

Including the first printed edition of 1475, this tract went through at least nine editions in Latin, five in German, and one in Italian. In the Escurial there exists a Spanish translation in manuscript. A Russian version was issued in 1855 by the Kiev Pecherskaya Lavra (Monastery). An English version by Thomas Calvert appeared at York in 1649 under the title, The Blessed Jew of Morocco; or, the black Moor Made white. There exists also, in manuscript, a Disputatio Abutalib Saraceni et Samuelis Judæi, consisting of seven epistles, translated from Arabic into Latin by Alfonsus Bonihominis.

See also 

 History of Jewish conversion to Christianity
 Adversus Judaeos

Notes

References

Sources 

 Biosca, Antoni (2010). "Alfonso Buenhombre". Thomas, David; Mallett, Alex (eds.). Christian-Muslim Relations 600–1500. Brill. Retrieved 15 August 2022.
 Biosca i Bas, Antoni (2015). "The Anti-Muslim Discourse of Alfonso Buenhombre". Szpiech, Ryan (ed.). Medieval Exegesis and Religious Difference. New York: Fordham UP. Retrieved 15 August 2022.  
 Di Cesare, Michelina (2011). "Alfonso Buenhombre, The Disputation between Abutalib the Saracen and Samuel the Jew; The Letter of Samuel". The Pseudo-historical Image of the Prophet Muhammad in Medieval Latin Literature: A Repertory. Berlin, Boston: De Gruyter. Retrieved 15 August 2022.
 Hirschfeld, Hartwig; Gottheil, Richard (1901). "Abbas, Samuel Abu Naṣr Ibn". In Singer, Isidore; et al. (eds.). The Jewish Encyclopedia. Vol. 1. New York: Funk & Wagnalls. p. 38.
 Limor, Ora (1997). "The Epistle of Rabbi Samuel of Morocco: A Best-Seller in the World of Polemics". In Limor, Ora; Stroumsa, Guy G. (eds.). Contra Iudaeos: Ancient and Medieval Polemics Between Christians and Jews. Tübingen: Mohr Siebeck. pp. 177–194.
 McClintock, John; Strong, James (1876). "Morocco, Samuel Israeli of". Cyclopædia of Biblical, Theological, and Ecclesiastical Literature. Vol. 6. New York: Harper & Brothers. pp. 649–650.
 Vauchez, André, ed. (2005). "Alfonso Buenhombre". Oxford Encyclopedia of the Middle Ages. Oxford Reference. Retrieved 15 August 2022.

1353 deaths
14th-century Galician people
14th-century Spanish writers
Dominican bishops
Spanish Dominicans
Dominican missionaries
13th-century births
Year of birth unknown
14th-century Roman Catholic bishops